The Bosniaks in North Macedonia number 17,018 people according to the 2002 census. The population is largely concentrated in and around the capital Skopje, but also in the municipalities of Veles and Dolneni.

Culture

Religion

Bosniaks started settling in Macedonia after the Congress of Berlin in 1878. Bosniaks in the Republic of Macedonia are predominantly adherents to Sunni Islam.

Historical censuses
The historical censuses in Yugoslavia recorded "Muslims" (Muslimani), the so-called ethnic Muslims, in the SR Macedonia at the numbers of: 1,248 (0.1%) in 1971; 39,512 (2.1%) in 1981; 35,256 (1.7%) in 1991.

Notable individuals 
 Adis Jahović, member of the Macedonian national football team
 Ferid Muhić, academician
 Cedi Osman, basketball player
 Elvira Rahić, singer

See also
Macedonian Muslims
Gorani people

References

 
Ethnic groups in North Macedonia
Islam in North Macedonia